Fangguang Temple is a Buddhist temple located on Mount Tiantai in Taizhou, Zhejiang, China. The temple is the Bodhimanda of Five Hundred Arhats.

History

Eastern Jin dynasty
The original temple dates back to the Xingning period (363–365) of the Jin dynasty (266–420), founded by monk Tanyou.

Tang dynasty
In the Tang dynasty (618–907), its name was changed into "Fangguang Shengshou Temple".

Five Dynasties and Ten Kingdoms
During the Five Dynasties and Ten Kingdoms (907–960), Qian Chu (929–988), the King of Wuyue (907–978), added the Hall of Five Hundred Arhats to the temple. Since then, Fangguang Temple became the Bodhimanda of Five Hundred Arhats.

Song dynasty
In the early Song dynasty (960–1279), the emperor inscribed and honored the name "Fangguang Chongchan Temple". In 1101, in the reign of Emperor Huizong (1101–1125), the temple reduced to ashes by a devastating fire. In 1198, almost a century later, Fangguang Temple was restored and redecorated.

Ming dynasty
In 1604, in the late Ming dynasty (1368–1644), Ge Yipeng supervised the reconstruction of Fangguang Temple. 30 years later, Wang Fuzhi and Xia Rubi raised funds to renovate the temple. Renovations and rebuilding to the main building began in 1634 and were completed in 1636.

Qing dynasty
In the ruling of Daoguang Emperor (1821–1850) in the Qing dynasty (1644–1911), Zeng Guoquan, a general of the Xiang Army, appropriated a large sum of money for refurbishing the temple.

People's Republic of China
During the ten-year Cultural Revolution, a disastrous fire consumed Fangguang Temple.

A modern restoration of the entire temple complex was carried out in 1980, after the 3rd Plenary Session of the 11th Central Committee of the Chinese Communist Party.

Fangguang Temple has been inscribed as a National Key Buddhist Temple in Han Chinese Area by the State Council of China in 1983.

Architecture
The existing main buildings include the Shanmen, Mahavira Hall, Hall of Five Hundred Arhats, Hall of Ksitigarbha, and wing-rooms.

References

Buddhist temples in Taizhou, Zhejiang
Buildings and structures in Taizhou, Zhejiang
Tourist attractions in Taizhou, Zhejiang
20th-century establishments in China
20th-century Buddhist temples
Religious buildings and structures completed in the 1980s
Tiantai County
Tiantai temples